Steve Patterson may refer to:
 Steve Patterson (basketball) (1948–2004), American basketball player and coach
 Steve Patterson (sports executive) (born 1958), American sports executive with teams in several different leagues
 Steve Patterson (comedian), Canadian stand-up comedian and humour writer
 Steve Patterson (soccer), American retired soccer player
 Steve Patterson (politician), American politician from Mississippi
 Steve Dylan, Canadian comedian and humour writer (The Jon Dore Television Show), formerly known as Steve Patterson

See also
Steven Patterson (born 1983), Yorkshire cricketer
Stephen Patterson (born 1971), Australian rules footballer
Steve Paterson (born 1958), Scottish footballer and manager